Mohammad Reza Mokhber Dezfouli (born 1960, in Dezfoul) is an Iranian politician, physician, scholar, academic and professor at the University of Tehran.
He is also a member of the Iranian Science and Culture Hall of Fame, former Secretary of the Supreme Council of the Cultural Revolution and a fellow of the Iranian Academy of Sciences.

References

Iranian scholars
20th-century Iranian physicians
Iranian politicians
Iranian Science and Culture Hall of Fame recipients in Medicine
21st-century Iranian physicians